Li Yuchao (born November 1962) is a general (shangjiang) of the People's Liberation Army (PLA) serving as commander of People's Liberation Army Rocket Force, succeeding Zhou Yaning in January 2022. He is an alternate member of the 19th Central Committee of the Chinese Communist Party.

Biography
Li was born in Sui County, Henan, in November 1962 and joined the People's Liberation Army in December 1980. He graduated from the PLA National Defence University. He served in the Second Artillery Corps for a long time. He led his troops participate the 60th anniversary of the People's Republic of China in 2009 and the 2015 China Victory Day Parade in 2015, respectively. He was commander of the 53rd Base from March 2015 to July 2016, the 55th Base from July 2016 to March 2017, and the 63rd Base from March 2017 to April 2020. He was assigned chief of staff of the People's Liberation Army Rocket Force in April 2020, and rose to become commander in January 2022.

He was promoted to the rank of major general (shaojiang) in July 2013, lieutenant general (zhongjiang) in April 2020 and general (shangjiang) in January 2022.

References

1963 births
Living people
People from Sui County, Henan
PLA National Defence University alumni
People's Liberation Army generals from Henan
People's Republic of China politicians from Henan
Chinese Communist Party politicians from Henan
Alternate members of the 19th Central Committee of the Chinese Communist Party